Mr. Popper's Penguins is a 2011 American family comedy film distributed by 20th Century Fox, loosely based on the 1938 children's book of the same name. It is directed by Mark Waters, produced by John Davis, co-produced by Davis Entertainment Company and Dune Entertainment, written by Sean Anders, John Morris and Jared Stern, and stars Jim Carrey in the title role. The film was originally slated for a release on August 12, 2011, but was moved up to June 17, 2011. The film received mixed reviews from critics and earned $187.3 million on a $55 million budget.

Plot
In an opening flashback, Thomas Popper Jr., is a child whose father traveled around the world during his childhood in the 1970s. Popper rarely sees his father, Thomas Sr., during his travels and communicates with him through shortwave radio.

In the present day, Popper is now a divorced real estate entrepreneur and a father of two children, Janie and Billy. After returning home from work one day, Popper learns that his father has died during an adventure to Antarctica and, as per his will, has left him with a "souvenir" from his adventures in Antarctica. The following week, a crate containing a gentoo penguin, named Captain, appears at his door. Popper immediately becomes annoyed with the penguin and locks him in a bathroom before going to work. After Captain accidentally floods his apartment with bath water, Popper calls his father's organization asking to return the penguin, but, due to a miscommunication, ends up receiving a shipment of five more penguins named Loudy, Bitey, Stinky, Lovey, and Nimrod.

Popper intends to give them away to the zoo, but changes his idea when his children think that the penguins are Billy's birthday present. An incensed Popper is forced to spend evenings taking care of the penguins and bribing the apartment clerk to not rat him out to the board, as pets are not allowed in the apartment. At one point, he receives an offer to take the penguins off his hands from Nat Jones, the antagonistic zookeeper at the New York Zoo, who warns him that the penguins won't survive at his house. Unknown to Popper, Jones also plans to trade the penguins for animals the zoo does not have.

At work, Popper is given the task of buying Tavern on the Green, the only privately owned piece of real estate in Central Park that is an old restaurant where he used to eat with his father when he was a child. However, the restaurant’s elderly owner, Selma Van Gundy, will only sell it to a person of true value. Popper has meetings with her, but due to him having to juggle them with taking care of the penguins, she begins to have some serious doubts about him.

As time goes on, having the penguins around helps Popper become closer to his children. The penguins lay three eggs. Two eggs hatch, but one does not. Popper becomes obsessed with seeing the last egg hatch, causing him to lose his job. Eventually Popper realizes that the egg is somehow unable to hatch, and, after being given permission from Jones to do so, decides to donate the penguins to the zoo. Then, he is re-employed but his children and ex-wife, Amanda, are disappointed by his decision.

Popper finds a letter from his father—included in the original crate with Captain but lost when Popper broke the crate by accident—telling him to hold his children close and love them and apologizing for not being a better father that Popper needed. Having second thoughts, Popper asks his children and former wife to help him get the penguins back from the zoo, however, they are not in the penguin enclosure. During a brief argument with Jones, he reveals to them his true motives for wanting the penguins and that he plans to separate them. After Jones lies and says that they're too late to save them, the family manages to find and free the penguins, while evading Jones and the zoo's security. Upon seeing how Popper had reunited his family and saved the penguins, Van Gundy sells him the restaurant while Jones is arrested. Popper decides to renovate and reopen the restaurant. Popper and his family travel to Antarctica with the penguins, allowing them to live with their own kind. Popper's first penguin, Captain, is revealed to have laid another egg. Popper tells his children that they will visit the penguins when the egg hatches.

Cast
 Jim Carrey as Tom Popper Jr.
 Henry Kelemen / Dylan Clark Marshall as Young Tom Popper Jr.
 Carla Gugino as Amanda Popper
 Madeline Carroll as Janie Popper
 Maxwell Perry Cotton as Billy Popper
 Angela Lansbury as Mrs. Selma Van Gundy
 Clark Gregg as Nat Jones
 Desmin Borges as Daryl
 Philip Baker Hall as Mr. Franklin
 Dominic Chianese as Mr. Reader
 Ophelia Lovibond as Mrs. Pippi Pepenopolis
 Jeffrey Tambor as Mr. Gremmins
 David Krumholtz as Kent
 James Tupper as Rick
 Brian T. Delaney as Young Tom Popper Sr. (voice)
 Matthew Wolf as Antarctic Friend (voice)
 Charles L. Campbell as Old Tom Popper Sr. (voice)
 Betsy Aidem as Tavern hostess
 Frank Welker as the penguins (vocal effects)

Production
Originally, Ben Stiller was slated to play Mr. Popper, and Noah Baumbach was originally going to direct, but they dropped out. Owen Wilson, Jack Black, and Jim Carrey were all considered to replace Stiller, with the role eventually going to Carrey. Mark Waters was chosen to direct. Filming began in October 2010, and finished in January 2011. On September 21, 2010, it was confirmed that Carla Gugino joined the cast as Tom's former wife Amanda Popper. Rhythm and Hues Studios did the penguin animations for certain shots. The musical score was composed by Rolfe Kent and orchestrated by Tony Blondal. It was recorded at the scoring stage at 20th Century Fox in Century City, California with a 78-piece orchestra. An online Museum Slide Game was created by designer Mark Kavanaugh as promotional material for the film.

The penguins portrayed in the film were a mix of real penguins and CGI.

Reception

Box office
Mr. Popper's Penguins was theatrically released on June 17, 2011 by 20th Century Fox. It earned $6.4 million on opening day and $18.4 million over the three-day weekend, ranking in third place behind Green Lantern and Super 8. The opening was at the high end of 20th Century Fox's expectations, which was predicting a mid- to high teens opening.

In its second weekend, the film faced competition from Cars 2 and dropped 45% to $10.1 million and ranked in fifth place. Over the four-day Independence Day holiday weekend, it ranked in eighth place after dropping 34% to $6.7 million. The film earned $68,224,452 domestically and $119,137,302 in foreign countries, grossing a total of $187,361,754 worldwide.

Critical response

On Rotten Tomatoes, the film has an approval rating of 47% based on 142 reviews with an average rating of 5.2/10. The site's critical consensus reads, "Blandly inoffensive and thoroughly predictable, Mr. Popper's Penguins could have been worse – but it should have been better." On Metacritic, the film has a score of 53 out of 100 based on 30 critics, indicating "mixed or average reviews". Audiences polled by CinemaScore gave the film an average grade of "A−" on an A+ to F scale.

Accolades 
BMI Film & TV Awards 2012

Kids' Choice Awards, USA 2012

MovieGuide Awards 2012

Release

Home media
Mr. Popper's Penguins was released on Blu-ray and DVD on December 6, 2011. It includes a short film called Nimrod and Stinky's Antarctic Adventure.

Soundtrack
 "Lucy in the Sky with Diamonds" – Written by John Lennon and Paul McCartney
 "Let It Snow! Let It Snow! Let It Snow!" – Written by Jule Styne and Sammy Cahn
 "Sweet N' Lo" – Written by Erwin Lehn
 "Doo Wah Dooh Wah" – Written and Performed by Syd Dale
 "Set 'Em Up Joe" – Written by Werner Tautz
 "Spin Spin" – Written by Steve Sidwell
 "Go Get It" – Written and Performed by Jeff Cardoni
 "Piano Lounge" – Written by Daniel May and Marc Ferrari
 "Ice Ice Baby" – Performed by Vanilla Ice
 "All Music" – Composed by Rolfe Kent
 Music from the Charles Chaplin movies

References

External links

 
 
 
 
 

2011 comedy films
2011 films
20th Century Fox films
American comedy films
Davis Entertainment films
Dune Entertainment films
Films about penguins
Films based on American novels
Films directed by Mark Waters
Films produced by John Davis
Films set in New York City
Films set in 1976
Films set in 1978
Films set in 1980
Films set in 1981
Films shot in New York City
Films with screenplays by Jared Stern
Films with screenplays by John Morris
Films with screenplays by Sean Anders
Films scored by Rolfe Kent
2010s English-language films
2010s American films